A by-election was held for the New South Wales Legislative Assembly electorate of Mudgee on 6 March 1883 because of the resignation of Adolphus Taylor after a heated argument with the member for Upper Hunter John McElhone in which McElhone challenged Taylor to resign and both would contest Taylor's seat.

Dates

Results

Adolphus Taylor resigned after a challenge by John McElhone.

Aftermath
McElhone was re-elected at the by-election for Upper Hunter which was conducted on the same day, with the Newcastle Morning Herald and Miners' Advocate reporting that McElhone had been nominated without his authority.

See also
Electoral results for the district of Mudgee
List of New South Wales state by-elections

References

1883 elections in Australia
New South Wales state by-elections
1880s in New South Wales